Shim Jae-chul (Hanja: 沈在哲 RR: Sim Jae-cheol; born 18 January 1958) is a South Korean journalist and politician. He is a current member of the National Assembly and the Floor Leader of the United Future Party.

Early life and career 
He was born in Gwangju. He became an activist during Gwangju Uprising in 1980. He graduated Seoul University department of English education. He later worked as a journalist of MBC in the late 1980s and early 1990s. He joined the New Korea Party following the recommendation from the ex-president Kim Young-sam, in 1996.

Shim was elected as the representative of Dongan-gu for the 16th National Assembly of the Republic of Korea in 2000. He has been reelected four times.

In 2016, he was elected as the First Deputy Speaker of the Parliament. He supported the impeachment of president Park Geun-hye.

In 2019, he was elected as the Floor Leader of the Liberty Korea Party, succeeding Na Kyung-won. Following the merger of the Liberty Korea Party with the New Conservative Party and Onward for Future 4.0, he retained his position.

Controversy

Human rights violation 
He was convicted of human rights violations during the early 1980s. He was an activist against Chun Doo-hwan, but he attempted to disorganize the protest. This decision led to a massacre.

After that, he tortured "activists for democracy". Rhyu Si-min was one of these victims.

Inappropriate behavior 
In 2013, he was caught looking at a nude photo on his phone.

He sent a Kakao Talk message that insulted the bereaved of Sewol sinking.

Rebellion  
On 28 November 2017, he declared that he would report president Moon Jae-in along with his secretaries as "rebellion".

References 

1958 births
Living people
Deputy Speakers of the National Assembly (South Korea)
South Korean journalists
Cheongsong Sim clan
Catholic University of Korea alumni
People from Gwangju
People Power Party (South Korea) politicians